The Republican Party of Moldova is a political party in Moldova.

History
Republican Party of Moldova (RPM) was established on 15 August 1999. The Founding Congress adopted the party program and bylaws and elected the governing bodies, including the Party Chairperson, Ion Curtean.

In the 5 April 2009 legislative elections, it did not pass the election threshold as it polled 0.09% of the vote. Before the early parliamentary elections of 29 July 2009, it withdrew from the race and campaigned for the Democratic Party of Moldova.

Former Minister of Foreign Affairs Andrei Stratan was elected leader of the Republican Party at the 1 August 2010 congress of the party by a unanimous vote. The party's former chairman Ion Curtean and vice chairman Valerian Hortolomei remained to work as part of the party, but it is not yet known what posts they will hold.

The Central Election Commission of Moldova registered the party as a participant in the campaign for the 5 September constitutional referendum. The party will campaign in favor of the referendum and urge the people to vote for amending Article 78 of the Constitution.

Chairperson
 Andrei Stratan
 Ion Curtean

References

External links
 Andrei Stratan becomes chairman of Republican Party  
 Republican Party of Moldova 
 Partidul Republican din Moldova (PRM)

Political parties in Moldova
Political parties established in 1999
1999 establishments in Moldova